The God-Shaped Void is the fifth studio album by American progressive metal band Psychotic Waltz, released on February 14, 2020. This is the band's first studio album since 1996's Bleeding.

Track listing

Personnel 
Psychotic Waltz
 Devon Graves – lead vocals, flute
 Dan Rock – guitars, keyboards
 Brian McAlpin – guitars
 Ward Evans – bass
 Norman Leggio – drums

Production
 Ulrich Wild – production
 Jens Bogren – mixing, mastering

Charts

See also
List of 2020 albums

References 

2020 albums
Inside Out Music albums
Albums produced by Ulrich Wild